Altona may refer to:

Places

Australia
 Altona Beach, in Altona, Victoria, Australia 
 Altona Meadows, Victoria, Australia
 Altona North, Victoria, Australia
 Altona, Victoria, a suburb of Melbourne, Australia
 Altona railway station
 Altona Refinery
 City of Altona, west of Melbourne
 Electoral district of Altona, a former electoral district in Victoria, Australia

Canada 
 Altona, Manitoba, Canada
 Altona, Ontario, Canada

Germany 
 Altona, Hamburg (or Hamburg-Altona), a borough of Hamburg
Altona-Nord, or Hamburg-Altona-Nord, a district of Hamburg, Germany
Altona-Altstadt, or Hamburg-Altona-Altstadt, a district of Hamburg, Germany
Hamburg-Altona station
Hamburg-Altona–Kiel railway
Hamburg-Altona–Neumünster railway
Hamburg-Altona link line
Hamburg-Altona (electoral district)
Fischmarkt Hamburg-Altona, a logistics company in Hamburg, Germany
Luna Park Hamburg-Altona, an amusement park in Hamburg, Germany
Altona Volkspark, an urban park in Altona, Hamburg

United States
 Altona, Colorado
 Altona, Illinois
 Altona, Indiana
 Altona, Michigan
 Altona, Missouri
 Altona, Nebraska
 Altona, New York, a town in Clinton County
 Altona (CDP), New York, within the town of Altona
 Altonah, Utah, also spelled Altona
 Altona (West Virginia), a historic farm near Charles Town
 Altona, Saint Croix, United States Virgin Islands
 Altona, Saint Thomas, United States Virgin Islands
 Altona, now New Holstein, Wisconsin

Other uses
 850 Altona, a minor planet in the Solar System
 Altona (sternwheeler), a steamboat on the Willamette River in Oregon, 1890
 MCP Altona, a container ship
 SS Altona (1877), a freighter
 Hamburg Altona (film), a 1989 Yugoslav film

See also
Altenahr
Altoona (disambiguation)
Altuna (disambiguation)